Le Livre des fuites was written in French by French Nobel laureate writer J. M. G. Le Clézio and translated into English as The Book of Flights: An Adventure Story  by  Simon Watson Taylor

Publication history

First French Edition

First English Edition, London

First English Edition, New York

Second English Edition

1965 French novels
Novels by J. M. G. Le Clézio
Works by J. M. G. Le Clézio
Éditions Gallimard books